Rough Diamond is the debut album of British rock band Rough Diamond.

Rough Diamond was formed by singer David Byron following his dismissal from Uriah Heep, along with former Humble Pie guitarist Clem Clempson and ex-Wings drummer Geoff Britton.  The album peaked at No. 103 on the Billboard 200 in 1977. The band opened for Peter Frampton in the spring of 1977 on the latter's US tour. The group disbanded shortly after releasing their debut. Bizarrely, for a few weeks, the band's roadie and driver was Royal Shakespeare Company actor Tony Rowlands.

Law suit:They were involved in a law suit in UK high court for use of name by West London band Rough Diamonds, who were managed by Nicky De-Fries brother of Bowie manager Tony (Mainman). Resulted in out of court financial settlement and transfer of name.

Ref: The Speedometors.

Track listing
 "Rock N' Roll" (Byron / Britton / Rushent)  – 3:28
 "Lookin' For You"  (Byron / Clempson / Butcher)  – 4:06
 "Lock & Key" (Byron / Clempson)  – 4:59
 "Seasong" (Byron / Clempson)  – 7:35
 "By The Horn" (Byron / Clempson)  – 3:13
 "Scared" (Byron / Clempson / Britton / Butcher / Bath)  – 5:33
 "Hobo" (Byron / Clempson / Britton / Butcher / Bath)  – 5:45
 "The Link" (Butcher)  – 2:19
 "End Of The Line" (Byron / Clempson / Britton / Butcher)  – 5:46

Personnel
Adapted from AllMusic.
David Byron – lead vocals, producer
Clem Clempson – guitars, producer
Willie Bath – bass Guitar
Damon Butcher – keyboards
Geoff Britton – drums
Steve Smith – producer
 Phill Brown – engineer
Richard Digby Smith – engineer
Dave Hutchins  – engineer
Clive Arrowsmith – photography
Eckford/Stimpson – cover design

References

David Byron albums
1977 debut albums